South Australia Police (SAPOL) is the police force of the Australian state of South Australia. SAPOL is an independent statutory agency of the Government of South Australia directed by the Commissioner of Police, who reports to the Minister for Police. SAPOL provides general duties policing, highway patrol, criminal investigation and emergency coordination services throughout the state. SAPOL is also responsible for road safety advocacy and education, and maintains the South Australian Road Safety Centre.

 the commissioner of police is Grant Stevens, who has been in the role since July 2015.

History

Early years
Formally established on 28 April 1838 under the command of Inspector Henry Inman, the force is the oldest in Australasia and is the third oldest organised police force in the world. The first force in the colony of South Australia consisted of  10 mounted constables and 10 foot constables.

In 1840, Major Thomas Shouldham O'Halloran was appointed as the first official Commissioner of Police. At this time, SAPOL consisted of one Superintendent, two Inspectors, three Sergeants and 47 Constables divided into foot and mounted sections.

From 1848 to 1867, SAPOL also served as the state fire and rescue service, until the precursor of the South Australian Metropolitan Fire Service was formed. They also supplied the Civil Ambulance Service from 1880 to 1954, when it was taken over by the St John Ambulance Service.

Female officers
In 1915, the first two female police officers, Kate Cocks and Annie Ross, were appointed.  This was six months after New South Wales commenced with two officers.  It had been said "it is easier to get into heaven than to join the women police". Cocks retired in 1935, and was the officer in charge of the largest female detachment of all Australian state police departments of 14, which was double the size of the next-nearest of New South Wales.

In 1929, officer Miss Daisy Curtis studied on a scholarship abroad to examine the 'methods of protecting women and children'. This included travels to the jurisdictions of Great Britain, Norway, Sweden, Germany, Nederlands, the United States of America, and New Zealand. (New Zealand did not get it first female officer until 1941.)

In 1999, SAPOL was the first Australian policing jurisdiction to appoint a female police officer, Senior Constable Jane Kluzek, to a tactical group.

Timeline of initiatives 

 1893: Introduced bicycles for metropolitan and country foot police

 1893: Pioneered the fingerprint system in Australia

 1987: The first Australian police service to introduce videotaping of "suspect person" interviews

 1993: Introduced Operation Nomad, as a policing initiative to reduce the threat of bushfires

 1996: Crime Stoppers launched

 2000s: Established neighbourhood policing teams in various metropolitan areas

 2011: The first police jurisdiction in Australia to launch its own web platform connecting mobile phone users to the latest police news

Responsibilities

Commissioner 
The commissioner of police, in addition to leading SAPOL, also serves as the State Emergency Coordinator and is responsible for major emergency response and command and control of major disasters, including bushfires, floods, and earthquakes. Under an emergency declaration the commissioner is extraordinary authority to create rules and regulations that may be enforced by police, for a limited time. Due to these laws, Commissioner Grant Stevens became a central figure in South Australia's response to the COVID-19 pandemic.
The powers of South Australia Police are defined in the Police Act 1998.

SAPOL
In addition to general law enforcement such as patrols and investigations, SAPOL is responsible for other services throughout the state. These include:

 Operating emergency assistance call centres for police, 000 (emergency telephone number)
 Non-urgent assistance call centres, 131 444 (non-emergency telephone number) 
 Coordinating and managing emergency disaster response
 Road safety advocacy and education
 Registration and licensing of firearms
 Liquor licensing enforcement
 Security of public buildings and officials
 Police prosecutions
 Victim support services

Organisation 

SAPOL's structure consists of various units. Through the chain of command, all units are accountable to the Commissioner. Services are the largest units, and are headed by a sworn assistant commissioner, or for areas which are not policing specific, such as information technology, a civilian Director. Services are directly accountable to either the Commissioner or Deputy Commissioner.

Services within metropolitan Adelaide are based on four different districts: North, East West and South. Each district has its own localised branch that provides specialised services or assistance, such as Criminal Investigation Branch (CIB), family violence, and intelligence sections. There are seven local service areas (LSAs) for remote and country areas within the remainder of the state.

Districts and local service areas 

Districts and LSAs are the main organisational unit to provide policing services to the public. A district and local service area contains a number of police stations, as well as specialist services to support frontline police such as detectives, crime scene investigators and traffic police. Each LSA has a designated office known as a 'Complex' where majority of operations in the area start. The LSA then have smaller community police stations for quick policing access.

Metropolitan districts and LSAs are divided into the Metropolitan Operations Service and the State Operations Service, which each have their own coordination branch and some other additional functions.

Metropolitan Districts (Metropolitan Operations Service) 
 Eastern District
 Northern District
 Southern District
 Western District
 Metropolitan Operations Service Coordination Branch
 Public Transport Safety Section

Local Service Areas (State Operations Service) 
 Barossa LSA
 Eyre and Western LSA
 Far North LSA
 Hills Fleurieu LSA
 Limestone Coast LSA
 Murray Mallee LSA
 Yorke Mid North LSA
 State Operations Service Coordination Branch
 State Tactical Response Group
 Traffic Services Branch (Highway Patrol)

Security and Emergency Management Service
Security and Emergency Management is led by an Assistant Commissioner.
 Security and Emergency Management Service Coordination Branch
 Communications Group
 Police Security Services Branch
 Security Advice Section
 Special Tasks and Rescue Group (STAR Group)
 STAR Group Police Tactical Group
 Dog Operations Unit
 Mounted Operations Unit
 Water Operations Unit
 PolAir
 Bomb Squad
 Negotiators
 Security Response Section
 State Protective Security Branch (Police Security Officers)

Operations Support Service
Operations Support is led by an Assistant Commissioner.
 Operations Support Service Coordination Branch
 Firearms Branch
 Forensic Services Branch
 Licensing Enforcement Branch
 Prosecution Services Branch
 State Intelligence Branch

Crime Service 
Crime Service is led by an Assistant Commissioner, usually a former Detective.
 Serious Crime Coordination Branch
 Financial and Cybercrime Investigation Branch
 Investigation Support Branch
 Major Crime Investigation Branch
 Public Protection Branch
 Serious and Organised Crime Branch

Governance and Capability Service 
Governance and Capability is led by an Assistant Commissioner.
 Governance and Capability Service
 Coordination Branch
 Commissioner’s Support Branch
 Communication and Engagement Branch
 Ethical and Professional Standards Branch
 Office of the General Counsel

Other services 
Each administrative service is led by a civilian director.
 Business Service
 Information Systems and Technology Service
 Human Resources Service

Ranking and structure

Police Officers 

All grades of constable perform the same basic range of duties, with the rank only reflecting experience. The rank of probationary constable is held for the first fifteen months of service. A constable with one stripe is qualified for promotion to senior constable. A senior constable first class is either an officer qualified for promotion to sergeant/senior sergeant or has won a senior constable first class position on merit. A brevet sergeant is the second in charge of a team and it can be a temporary designation for an officer in a particular position which would require specialised skills, such as a detective. 

A sergeant normally manages a team during a shift. A sergeant may also manage a small country station. A detective sergeant is normally in charge of a team in an investigations section. As with a sergeant, a detective sergeant may be the officer in charge of a country CIB unit. A senior sergeant is the officer in charge of a section, including traffic, criminal investigation, and operations (uniform), and traditionally does more administrative work than active patrol duties.

Officers of Police were formerly known as commissioned officers. This name was changed as SAPOL officers no longer receive a Queen's Commission. Officers of Police act primarily as managers and generally do not partake in operational policing. An Inspector is in charge of a section. A detective inspector is normally in charge of the whole station CIB. A uniform inspector is normally in charge of the station's operations.

A chief inspector commands a department at station level. A uniform chief inspector is in charge of all uniformed officers, regardless of their attachments to assigned areas (e.g. general duties, traffic duties etc.). Some country LSAs have chief inspectors as the regional commander. A detective chief inspector is in charge of all CIB-related matters.

Superintendents, chief superintendents and commanders may be the manager of a Local Service Area or Branch, such as the Major Crime Branch. An LSA commander is generally a superintendent. A chief superintendent may be the manager of a specialised area, such as a Service Coordination Branch. Few commanders are appointed. The Industrial Relations Branch has a commander as its officer in charge.

An assistant commissioner is the manager of a service, such as Northern Operations Service or Crime Service.

The Deputy Commissioner is the assistant to the Commissioner, who commands the organisation.

Police Security Officers 
Police Security Officers (PSOs) (formerly Protective Security Officers) are armed security police officers originally employed by SAPOL to perform security functions at government properties, to provide security to protected persons (such as the Governor of South Australia) and to monitor metropolitan CCTV cameras. PSOs functions and duties have over time increased to include duties traditionally performed by sworn Police Officers. PSOs normally have limited powers and are limited to using those power in prescribed circumstances or locations, however, under current legislation passed in 2022, PSOs duties may be extended by the Commissioner of Police and they may be granted full police powers and immunities in the performance of those duties. PSOs were utilised in the states response to the COVID-19 pandemic. PSOs have their own rank structure.

Uniform and equipment

Uniforms 

SAPOL issues uniforms to sworn police officers. Police officers working in non-specialised areas generally wear a standard uniform, which consists of a navy blue collared shirt with attached police badges and navy blue slacks. Short and long sleeve shirts are worn as preferred. Police officers can choose between either a dark blue peaked hat or an Akubra wide-brimmed hat and are not required to wear a tie. Baseball caps are worn in specialist areas, including STAR Group, Crime Scene, State Traffic Enforcement Section, and by Operational Safety Trainers. Officers in northern country areas wear khaki uniforms instead of blue. PSOs (Police Security Officers) wear slightly different shirts. The shirts and slacks are also navy blue, but they have golden markings and PSO markings. In the past, the shirt was white. This was changed at the end of 2019.

In 2010 SAPOL started consultations on a new darker uniform reminiscent of those worn by officers of the NYPD and LAPD. In 2012 SAPOL announced the new uniform would be introduced in mid-October 2012 and would be rolled out over 18 months. The only visible change from the consultation period was to the peaked cap. The white peak was changed to the same dark blue as the shirt and pants, which is called ink blue. SAPOL has implemented the use of stab-resistant vests for all patrol officers, PSOs and Police dogs.

Equipment and weaponry 

Standard equipment issued to almost all officers are:
 Smith & Wesson M&P .40 S&W semi-automatic pistol
 Pepper spray 
 ASP Extendable Baton
 Handcuffs
 Taser
 Light ballistic vest
 Bodycam

Criminal Investigation Officers are issued with the compact version of the semi-automatic pistol (M&Pc). Specialised units such as Special Tasks and Rescue (STAR Group) use other equipment suited to the nature of their duties. SA Police were among the last to carry revolvers as a duty weapon. They carried Smith & Wesson Model 66 (a variant of the Model 19) revolvers in .357 Magnum until the switch to the Smith & Wesson M&P semi automatic in 2009.

Drones have been used for surveillance since June 2013.

In July 2020, a new rapid response armed unit the Security Response Section consisting of 48 officers who carry semi-automatic rifles became operational.

Transport

Vehicles 
SAPOL officers use a number of vehicles in day-to-day duties. Throughout its history SAPOL has mostly used the Holden Commodore as its primary vehicle. Since the phasing out of the Holden Commodore SAPOL has recently switched to the Kia Sorento and Toyota RAV 4 as general duties vehicles. 

The Volkswagen Tiguan has recently been introduced primarily for traffic related duties. SAPOL also uses vehicles including the Toyota Kluger, Mitsubishi Outlander and Toyota Camry. Also used are VW Transporter, Toyota Hilux, Holden Colorado, Isuzu D-MAX caged vehicles for prisoner transport and the 2-Door Ford Ranger with canopy for the Dog Operations Unit. In remote country areas, Toyota Land Cruisers and Troop Carriers are used as primary patrol vehicles. Patrol cars are used in both marked and unmarked variants, with the latter being a bit more extensive in its vehicle composition. SAPOL have also, in previous years, used high performance vehicles such as Holden's SS Commodore for traffic operations.
High Ranking Commissioned Officers are issued unmarked top of the range vehicles. 
In the past it has been the Holden Calais and Holden Acadia LTZ-V SUV and currently the Kia Sorrento SUV. 

Members of the State Traffic Enforcement Section ride marked and unmarked Honda and BMW motorcycles for traffic, escort, and other duties.

Specialised vehicles 

SAPOL utilise specialised Vehicles which are used in a wide variety of ways, for example, as a mobile police station/unit at a large public function, or as forward command posts at search and rescues, or other incidents such as siege or hostage situations. STAR Group also possess a Lenco BearCat armoured vehicle available for use in a siege or terrorist situations.

Watercraft 
The SAPOL Water Operations Unit uses a number of watercraft including boats and Jet Skis to police coastal and inland waterways.

Mounted branch 
For ceremonial activities, crowd control and patrol duties, the SAPOL Mounted Operations Unit use grey horses. They are bred and trained at the Thebarton Police Barracks, in Park 27 of the Adelaide Park Lands, just northeast of the Adelaide city centre. These "police greys", as they are known, are ideal for police work as the light grey tones make the horse highly visible at night. They are also highly recognisable in the community and are often involved in community events such as leading the annual Credit Union Christmas Pageant and ANZAC Day parade. The Thebarton Police Barracks will be under the South Australian Governments plan to replace the current Women's and Children's Hospital and replaced with a new facility.

Aircraft 
Members of STAR Group and Transit Services Branch act as crew members on a modified Bell 412 Helicopter (callsign PolAir 53) which features an array of thermal and imagine sensors, aircraft is marked in a SAPOL livery. SAPOL also use a Pilatus PC-12 aircraft which is used to convey Police and prisoners across the state.

Training and education 

Recruit training is conducted at the SAPOL Police Academy located adjacent to the old barracks adjacent to Fort Largs in the north-western Adelaide suburb of Taperoo. Cadets undergo a 52-week course, called the "Constable Development Program" (CDP). The CDP is broken down into five phases, which includes training at the Police Academy and field experience at metropolitan LSAs. Police cadets learn law, about investigations and police procedures. During recruit training, non-officers (police staff and volunteers) assist with various duties, such as cadet assessment, role playing and general administration. Cadets also undertake operational safety training, including self-defence and the use of firearms. Practical role-playing and assessments are part of the course. Training with police dogs and police horses is offered at the Thebarton Police Barracks. Earlier, training was being held at the older Academy located next to the present one.

Graduation and aftermath for new officers 

Cadets graduate with the rank of probationary constable and are subject to a 15-month period of on-the-job training. Probationary Constables are required to work with a Field Tutor for the first 6 months of the probationary period whilst they complete a Personal Learning Portfolio. Probationary Constables also undertake a range of duties to enhance their learning, including traffic, prisoner management, and general duties. For the following 6 months, probationary constables continue to collect evidence of their workplace competency before attending the Probationary Constable Assessment Workshop to determine whether they are suitable to progress to the rank of Constable. Upon completion of the probationary period, officers receive a Diploma of Public Safety (Policing) and are appointed to the rank of Constable.

Training is ongoing and further courses are available for officers to attend, should they wish to progress their policing career further.

SAPOL Protective Security Officers also undergo training at this location. The duration of this training course is only 12 weeks.

Radio communications 

SAPOL refers to the communications operation as "VKA". At 0400 hours (4am) on Tuesday 10 December 2002, SAPOL officially switched from standard 64 UHF channels to the SA Government Radio Network (SAGRN). This utilised digital encrypted radio transmissions meaning that scanners could not listen to police communications. While at first there seemed to be technical issues with the new system, they were quickly resolved and the department now has full trust in the system.

SAPOL still have UHF licences and it is plausible they are available as back-up communication channels. SAPOL uses three primary devices for voice communication over the network. They are Spectra W7 mobile, XTS 5000 portable and Spectra W3 mobile. These can be controlled via the RCH3000 desktop controller, used in fixed locations generally by trained operators.

These devices have a number of features that are regularly used in patrols. These features include private call, page alert and telephone interconnect.

Private call allows units to directly talk to another unit without dispatch, or other users in the talkgroup to hear. However, this comes with the inability for dispatch to contact either unit.  Page function alerts another radio that someone else is attempting to contact them. Telephone interconnect enables units to make and answer calls through the system. However, only supervisors have the ability to make and answer to any number, general patrols are restricted to only a list of certified SAPOL numbers. Each LSA has two assigned 'talkgroups'.

COMCEN (Communications) have assigned talkgroup IDs, allowing them to pair an LSA's primary and secondary talkgroups together allowing control to manage two channels at once. The Secondary channel is often used for local/chat, dispatch lowers the volume of the secondary channel, which enables them to monitor the channels and talk to all units on duty in the LSA.

Call signs and unit designation identification system 

SAPOL use location-based call signs. Units are called in by stating the station they come from followed by a designated number.

Examples:
 A unit in Holden Hill could be Holden Hill 16. 
 Traffic Services place a zero (0) before the number, for example, Holden Hill 016 would be a traffic patrol in Holden Hill with the call sign 16. 
 Higher-ranked officers have a different prefix. This is followed after the station name, and before the unit number:
 Sergeant = Vixen
 Senior sergeant = Mitre
 Inspector/chief inspector = Trojan
 Superintendent/chief superintendent = Baron
 Example: Holden Hill Mitre 10 is a senior sergeant in Holden Hill with the unit number 10.

Notable incidents 

In 1988 Detective Chief Inspector Barry Moyse (died 2010, aged 65), the former officer in charge of the drug squad was convicted and would serve twenty years in gaol for supplying heroin and other drugs, which he had seized from dealers.

In 1994 a bombing at the National Crime Authority Adelaide offices killed Western Australian Police Det Sgt Geoffrey Bowen and severely injured others. The bomb was concealed in a parcel that was addressed to Bowen. Domenic Perre, who had been identified as a person of interest shortly after the bombing and a known crime figure was convicted of the bombing in 2022, 28 years after it occurred.

During the 2016 South Australian blackout SAPOL Commissioner Grant Stevens declared a major incident under the Emergency Management Act. During the incident, Police Officers who were not responding to distress calls were ordered to undertake traffic control duties in the stormy conditions due to all traffic lights around the state becoming inoperable.

List of commissioners

See also 

 South Australia Police Historical Society 
 Law enforcement in Australia

Notes

References

Further reading 
 Clyne, Robert (1987), Colonial Blue: A history of the South Australian Police Force, 1836–1916, Wakefield Press

External links 
 
 

 
Law enforcement agencies of South Australia
Emergency services in South Australia